Teratology is the study of abnormalities of physiological development in organisms during their life span. It is a sub-discipline in medical genetics which focuses on the classification of congenital abnormalities in dysmorphology caused by teratogens. Teratogens are substances that may cause non-heritable birth defects via a toxic effect on an embryo or fetus. Defects include malformations, disruptions, deformations, and dysplasia that may cause stunted growth, delayed mental development, or other congenital disorders that lack structural malformations. The related term developmental toxicity includes all manifestations of abnormal development that are caused by environmental insult.

Etymology 

Old literature referred to abnormalities of all kinds under the Latin term Lusus naturae (lit. "freak of nature"). As early as the 17th century, Teratology referred to a discourse on prodigies and marvels of anything so extraordinary as to seem abnormal. In the 19th century, it acquired a meaning more closely related to biological deformities, mostly in the field of botany. Currently, its most instrumental meaning is that of the medical study of teratogenesis, congenital malformations or individuals with significant malformations. Historically, people have used many pejorative terms to describe/label cases of significant physical malformations. In the 1960s, David W. Smith of the University of Washington Medical School (one of the researchers who became known in 1973 for the discovery of fetal alcohol syndrome), popularized the term teratology.  With the growth of understanding of the origins of birth defects, the field of teratology  overlaps with other fields of science, including developmental biology, embryology, and genetics.

Until the 1940s, teratologists regarded birth defects as primarily hereditary. In 1941, the first well-documented cases of environmental agents being the cause of severe birth defects were reported.

Teratogenesis

Wilson's principles of teratogenesis 
In 1959, and in his 1973 monograph Environment and Birth Defects, embryologist James Wilson put forth six principles of teratogenesis to guide the study and understanding of teratogenic agents and their effects on developing organisms:

 Susceptibility to teratogenesis depends on the genotype of the conceptus and the manner in which this interacts with adverse environmental factors.
 Susceptibility to teratogenesis varies with the developmental stage at the time of exposure to an adverse influence. There are critical periods of susceptibility to agents and organ systems affected by these agents.
 Teratogenic agents act in specific ways on developing cells and tissues to initiate sequences of abnormal developmental events.
 The access of adverse influences to developing tissues depends on the nature of the influence. Several factors affect the ability of a teratogen to contact a developing conceptus, such as the nature of the agent itself, route and degree of maternal exposure, rate of placental transfer and systemic absorption, and composition of the maternal and embryonic/fetal genotypes.
 There are four manifestations of deviant development (Death, Malformation, Growth Retardation and Functional Defect).
 Manifestations of deviant development increase in frequency and degree as dosage increases from the No Observable Adverse Effect Level (NOAEL) to a dose producing 100% Lethality (LD100).

Research into teratogenesis 
Studies designed to test the teratogenic potential of environmental agents use animal model systems (e.g., rat, mouse, rabbit, dog, and monkey). Early teratologists exposed pregnant animals to environmental agents and observed the fetuses for gross visceral and skeletal abnormalities. While this is still part of the teratological evaluation procedures today, the field of Teratology is moving to a more molecular level, seeking the mechanism(s) of action by which these agents act. One example of this is the use of mammalian animal models to evaluate the molecular role of teratogens in the development of embryonic populations, such as the neural crest, which can lead to the development of neurocristopathies. Genetically modified mice are commonly used for this purpose. In addition, pregnancy registries are large, prospective studies that monitor exposures women receive during their pregnancies and record the outcome of their births. These studies provide information about possible risks of medications or other exposures in human pregnancies. Prenatal alcohol exposure (PAE) can produce craniofacial malformations, a phenotype that is visible in Fetal Alcohol Syndrome. Current evidence suggests that craniofacial malformations occur via: apoptosis of neural crest cells, interference with neural crest cell migration, as well as the disruption of sonic hedgehog (shh) signaling.

Understanding how a teratogen causes its effect is not only important in preventing congenital abnormalities but also has the potential for developing new therapeutic drugs safe for use with pregnant women.

Causes 
Causes of teratogenesis can broadly be classified as:
 Toxic substances, such as, for humans, drugs in pregnancy and environmental toxins in pregnancy.
 Potassium iodide is a possible teratogen. Potassium iodide in its raw form is a mild irritant and should be handled with gloves. Chronic overexposure can have adverse effects on the thyroid.
 Vertically transmitted infection
 Lack of nutrients. For example, lack of folate acid in the nutrition in pregnancy for humans can result in spina bifida. Folic acid is a synthetic form of folate. Folic acid is added to processed food products, such as flour and breakfast cereals. High levels of un-metabolized folic acid have been associated with several health problems.
 Physical restraint. An example is Potter syndrome due to oligohydramnios in humans.
 Genetic disorders
 Alcohol consumption during pregnancy.
Some specific examples of teratogens include: retinol, thalidomide, mercury, alcohol, lead, polychlorinated biphenyls (PCBs), and 2,3,7,8-tetrachlorodibenzodioxin.

Humans 

In humans, congenital disorders resulted in about 510,000 deaths globally in 2010.

About 3% of newborns have a "major physical anomaly", meaning a physical anomaly that has cosmetic or functional significance. Congenital disorders are responsible for 20% of infant deaths. The most common congential diseases are heart defects, Down syndrome, and neural tube defects. Trisomy 21 is the most common type of Down Syndrome. About 95% of infants have this disorder and consists of 3 separate copies of chromosomes. Translocation Down syndrome is not as common, but 3% of infants are diagnosed with it . VSD, ventricular septal defect, is the most common type of heart defect in infants. If an infant has a large VSD it can result into heart failure . infants with smaller VSD has a 96% of survival rate and those with a moderate VSD have about an 86% chance of survival rate. Lastly, NTD, neural tube defect, is a defect that forms in the brain and spine during early development. If the spinal cord is exposed and touching the skin it can require surgery to prevent an infection.

Alcohol use while pregnant 

Alcohol is known to act as a teratogen.
Prenatal alcohol exposure (PAE) remains the leading cause of birth defects and neurodevelopmental abnormalities in the United States, affecting 9.1 to 50 per 1000 live births in the U.S. and 68.0 to 89.2 per 1000 in populations with high levels of alcohol use.

Vaccinating while pregnant 
In humans, vaccination has become readily available, and is important to the prevention of some diseases like polio, rubella, smallpox and COVID-19, among others. There has been no association between congenital malformations and vaccination, as shown in Finland in which expecting mothers received the oral polio vaccine and saw no difference in infant outcomes then mothers who had not received the vaccine. However, it is still not recommended to vaccinate for polio while pregnant unless there is risk of infection. Another important implication of this includes the ability to get the influenza vaccine while pregnant. During the 1918 and 1957 influenza pandemics, mortality from influenza in pregnant women was 45%. Munoz et al. demonstrated that there was no adverse outcome observed in the new infants or mothers.

Other animals

Fossil record 

Evidence for congenital deformities found in the fossil record is studied by paleopathologists, specialists in ancient disease and injury. Fossils bearing evidence of congenital deformity are scientifically significant because they can help scientists infer the evolutionary history of life's developmental processes. For instance, because a Tyrannosaurus rex specimen has been discovered with a block vertebra, it means that vertebrae have been developing the same basic way since at least the most recent common ancestor of dinosaurs and mammals. Other notable fossil deformities include a hatchling specimen of the bird-like dinosaur, Troodon, the tip of whose jaw was twisted. Another notably deformed fossil was a specimen of the choristodere Hyphalosaurus, which had two heads- the oldest known example of polycephaly.

Chick embryo limb development 
Thalidomide is a teratogen known to be significantly detrimental to the development of certain body parts and organs in the body, such as the eyes or the heart. During embryogenesis, it is observed that many different organisms experience different impacts of teratogens on organ morphogenesis and development overall. One of these organisms that are popular to study the malformations created by thalidomide are chick embryos. It is observed that thalidomide induces limb outgrowth deformities through inducing oxidative stress and thereby enhancing genetic signaling through irregular expression of bone morphogenic proteins, Bmp. According to a study that was performed in 2007, the results revealed that with the increased oxidative stress thalidomide promotes, the up-regulation of the Bmp target gene and Wnt antagonist (Dkk1) this in turn inhibited canonical Wnt/B-catenin signaling and an increase in cell death was observed. The thalidomide induced cell death was significantly reduced when the introduction of inhibitors against Bmp, Dkk1 (Wnt antagonist), and Gsk3B (B-catenin antagonist) was administered into the chick embryos and cell death of the limb tissue was decreased. These results helped to conclude that these three pathways significantly impacted by thalidomide for chick limb development and that the teratogenic outcomes of the limb development deficiencies thalidomide creates can be reversed if these three pathways are inhibited.

Mouse embryo limb development 
Retinoic acid (RA) is significant in embryonic development. It induces the function of limb patterning of a developing embryo in species such as mice and other vertebrate limbs For example, during the process of regenerating a newt limb an increased amount of RA moves the limb more proximal to the distal blastoma and the extent of the proximalization of the limb increases with the amount of RA present during the regeneration process. A study looked at the RA activity intracellularly in mice in relation to human regulating CYP26 enzymes which play a critical role in metabolizing RA. This study also helps to reveal that RA is significant in various aspects of limb development in an embryo, however irregular control or excess amounts of RA can have teratogenic impacts causing malformations of limb development. They looked specifically at CYP26B1 which is highly expressed in regions of limb development in mice. The lack of CYP26B1 was shown to cause a spread of RA signal towards the distal section of the limb causing proximo-distal patterning irregularities of the limb. Not only did it show spreading of RA but a deficiency in the CYP26B1 also showed an induced apoptosis effect in the developing mouse limb but delayed chondrocyte maturation, which are cells that secrete a cartilage matrix which is significant for limb structure. They also looked at what happened to development of the limbs in wild type mice, that are mice with no CYP26B1 deficiencies, but which had an excess amount of RA present in the embryo. The results showed a similar impact to limb patterning if the mice did have the CYP26B1 deficiency meaning that there was still a proximal distal patterning deficiency observed when excess RA was present. This then concludes that RA plays the role of a morphogen to identify proximal distal patterning of limb development in mice embryos and that CYP26B1 is significant to prevent apoptosis of those limb tissues to further proper development of mice limbs in vivo.

Plantae 
In botany, teratology investigates the theoretical implications of abnormal specimens. For example, the discovery of abnormal flowers—for example, flowers with leaves instead of petals, or flowers with staminoid pistils—furnished important evidence for the "foliar theory", the theory that all flower parts are highly specialised leaves.

Types of deformations in plants 
Plants can have mutations that leads to different types of deformations such as:
 Fasciation: Development of the apex (growing tip) in a flat plane perpendicular to the axis of elongation
 Variegation: Degeneration of genes, manifesting itself among other things by anomalous pigmentation
 Virescence: Anomalous development of a green pigmentation in unexpected parts of the plant
 Phyllody: Floral organs or fruits transformed into leaves
 Witch's broom: Unusually high multiplication of branches in the upper part of the plant, mainly in a tree
 Pelorism: Zygomorphic flower regress to their ancestral actinomorphic symmetry
 Proliferation: Repetitive growth of an entire organ, such as a flower

See also 

 Carcinogen
 Congenital abnormalities
 Mutagen
 Polydactyly
 Retinoic acid
 Teratoma
 Thalidomide

References

External links 

 Society of Teratology
 European Teratology Society
 Organization of Teratology Information Specialists
 March of Dimes Foundation
 A Telling of Wonders: Teratology in Western Medicine through 1800 (New York Academy of Medicine Historical Collections)
 The Reproductive Toxicology Center Database

Alcohol and health
Developmental biology
Radiation health effects
Substance-related disorders
Teratogens